Jasper Simmons (born August 20, 1989) is a Canadian football linebacker. He played for the Calgary Stampeders and the Ottawa Redblacks of the Canadian Football League (CFL). He played college football at Missouri.

College career
Simmons attended Hutchinson Community College for two years before attending the University of Missouri in 2009 and 2010. As a senior, he was suspended indefinitely by Missouri.

Professional career

Toronto Argonauts 
Simmons signed with the Toronto Argonauts of the Canadian Football League in 2011. He saw limited playing time in two seasons with the Argos; totaling only 6 defensive tackles, 4 special teams tackles and 2 interceptions.

Ottawa RedBlacks 
In 2014, he signed with the Ottawa Redblacks. That season, he led the RedBlacks in tackles with 80, and also had 2 interceptions for 61 yards.

Calgary Stampeders 
On January 15, 2015, the Ottawa RedBlacks traded Jasper Simmons and WR Dan Buckner to the Stampeders in exchange for WR Maurice Price. He was released by the Stampeders on August 18, 2015.

Winnipeg Blue Bombers
Simmon signed with the Winnipeg Blue Bombers on August 19, 2015.

References

External links
Calgary Stampeders bio 
Ottawa Redblacks bio
Missouri Tigers bio

1989 births
Living people
Players of Canadian football from Pensacola, Florida
Players of American football from Pensacola, Florida
American football safeties
Canadian football linebackers
Hutchinson Blue Dragons football players
Missouri Tigers football players
Toronto Argonauts players
Ottawa Redblacks players